"Memories" is the forty-first episode and the sixth episode of the third season (1988–89) of the television series The Twilight Zone. In this episode, a specialist in past life regression enters an alternate reality in which reincarnation is real and everyone remembers all their past lives.

Plot
Past life regression therapist Mary McNeal has had great success in using hypnosis to make patients remember past lives, but when she tries to trigger memories of her own past lives, the recordings of her hypnosis technique just bore her to sleep.

One day Mary pays a house call, but her patient says she already knows about her past lives and dismisses her. Mary finds her office is now an employment counseling center. Accepting that reality is now changed such that she no longer has a job, she agrees to a session with Jim Sinclair, the employment counselor. She has no useful skills in her current life, since in this reality everyone remembers all their past lives, leaving no demand for regression therapists, so Jim asks her for her background from her past lives. She tells him she cannot recall any of them. He does not believe her, so she leaves.

Mary finds a woman outside suffering from exposure and offers to get help. The woman refuses and reminds Mary that the law grants people the right to commit suicide so as to move on from a unsatisfactory life to a potentially better one. Mary convinces her that she is needed here and runs to get help, but is abducted by Jim. Jim reveals he is a member of a paramilitary organization. He and his associate accuse her of pretending not to recall her past lives because she is a reincarnation of a notorious person who could face retribution for crimes in previous lives. They give her truth serum and interrogate her about her past lives, but she insists she does not remember.

Convinced she is telling the truth, they ask Mary to help them forget their past lives, to stop trying to avenge injuries or yearn for joys from the past. Mary goes to work with Jim, using hypnosis to make people forget about their past lives.

External links
 

1988 American television episodes
The Twilight Zone (1985 TV series season 3) episodes
Unemployment in fiction
Alternate history television episodes
Fiction about memory
Television episodes about reincarnation
Television episodes about parallel universes

fr:Régression de mémoire